Khagaria Junction railway station (station code: KGG) is a railway station in the Sonpur railway division of East Central Railway. Khagaria Station is located in Khagaria block in Khagaria district in the Indian state of Bihar.

References

Railway stations in Khagaria district
Railway junction stations in Bihar
Sonpur railway division